The Great Ice Rip-Off is a 1974 American made-for-television crime comedy film directed by Dan Curtis.  It premiered on ABC as the ABC Movie of the Week on November 6, 1974.

Synopsis
The Great Ice Rip-Off a comedic heist film about a group of diamond thieves who use a bus headed from Seattle to San Diego for their getaway.

Primary cast
 Lee J. Cobb as Willy Calso
 Gig Young as Harkey Rollins
 Matt Clark as Georgie
 Grayson Hall as Helen Calso
 Robert Walden as Checker 
 Geoffrey Lewis as Archie
 Hank Garrett as Sam

Production
The working title for the film was A Break in the Ice.

Critical response
Variety reviewed the film as having "enough sharp corners to keep viewers alert, and Curtis' eye for human foibles manages to get laughs.  Curtis picks up credit for being able to derive amusement from a caper film after the onslaught of the genre in recent years."

References

External links
 

ABC Movie of the Week
1974 television films
1974 films
1970s crime comedy films
1970s heist films
American crime comedy films
Films directed by Dan Curtis
American heist films
1974 comedy films
1970s American films